Donje Selo may refer to the following places:

Donje Selo (Goražde) in Bosnia and Herzegovina
Donje Selo (Ilijaš) in Bosnia and Herzegovina
Donje Selo (Konjic) in Bosnia and Herzegovina
Donje Selo, Danilovgrad in Montenegro